The Haxey Hood is a traditional event in Haxey, North Lincolnshire, England. It consists of a game in which a large football scrum (the "sway") pushes a leather tube (the "hood") to one of four pubs in the town, where it remains until the following year's game. The game is played on 6 January, the Twelfth Day of Christmas (unless the 6th falls on a Sunday, in which case the event is held on the Saturday).

History

Haxey and Westwoodside lie in an area of North Lincolnshire known as the Isle of Axholme. The official story is that in the 14th century, Lady de Mowbray, wife of an Isle landowner, John De Mowbray, was out riding towards Westwoodside on the hill that separates it from Haxey. As she went over the hill her silk riding hood was blown away by the wind. Thirteen farm workers in the field rushed to help and chased the hood all over the field. It was finally caught by one of the farm workers, but being too shy to hand it back to the lady, he gave it to one of the others to hand back to her. She thanked the farm worker who had returned the hood and said that he had acted like a Lord, whereas the worker who had actually caught the hood was a Fool. So amused was she by this act of chivalry and the resulting chase, that she donated  of land on condition that the chase for the hood would be re-enacted each year. This re-enactment over the centuries has become known as "The Haxey Hood".

In folklore, when a custom is too old for its origins to be remembered, a story is often devised to rationalise what would otherwise be baffling. However the "official" story of the Hood's origins is not that unlikely. Others have noted possible similarities between the Hood and hoods worn by bog burials in Northern Europe and noted that the game takes place on the border of bogs where naturally-preserved mummies of supposed prehistoric sacrifices have been found. However, hoods have been found on deposited bodies in Scandinavia but not in Britain or in Ireland.

The nobles mentioned in the story did exist. Records show that John De Mowbray (29 November 1310 – 4 October 1361), the 3rd Baron Mowbray of Axholme, would be the most likely candidate for the husband of the lady. This would date the Hood to about 1359 when a deed granting land to commoners was enacted by the baron. This would make the Hood around 650 years old, making it likely to be the oldest surviving tradition in England.

It has similarities to other village combats, such as Ashbourne's Royal Shrovetide Football, the Shrove Tuesday Football Games in Sedgefield, Durham and Alnwick, Northumberland and the Hallaton Bottle Kicking contest in Leicestershire.

Speculation regarding the hood having originally been the head or penis of a sacrificial animal used in a fertility ritual is just that – pure speculation. No evidence can be found for it.

The song "Drink Old England Dry" (Roud 882) is associated with the hood and has only rarely been recorded elsewhere.

Preparations
In the weeks before the event, the Fool and the Boggins tour nearby villages in order to collect money (traditionally to pay for the event, but now to raise money for local charities). Traditionally they sing a number of well-known folk songs including "John Barleycorn", "Cannons (Drink England Dry)" and "The Farmer's Boy". All wear their full festival costumes, the only exception being that the Fool's face is not marked.

At 12 noon, work in the parish comes to a standstill and people start to make their way to Haxey village to gather and take part in the traditional ritual. At about 12:30 the officials start a tour of the ale houses involved, and drink free drinks at each pub, provided by the landlord as a token of good luck to try to bring the Hood its way. Many people follow this tour and consider it a vital part of the day. They start at the Carpenters Arms where they sing the traditional folk songs and ceremoniously paint the Fool's face. Then they move to the Kings Arms and then up towards the church, taking in the Loco and the Duke William on the way, drinking and singing as they go. Around 2:30 pm the officials leave the Duke and process up to the church.

The Fool leads the procession and has the right to kiss any woman on the way. Once at the green in front of the Parish Church, at around 2:30, the Fool makes his traditional speech of welcome standing on an old mounting block in front of the church known as the Mowbray Stone. During this speech a fire is lit with damp straw behind him. The smoke rises up and around him and this is known as "Smoking the Fool". This is a watered-down version of the earlier custom (abandoned at the beginning of the 20th century due to its obvious danger) in which a more substantial fire was lit with damp straw beneath a tree. The Fool was then suspended over the fire and swung back and forth until he was almost suffocated before being cut down and dropped into the fire, from where he had to make his escape as best he could. The Fool finishes his speech with the traditional words that the crowd chant along with him. They are: "hoose agen hoose, toon agen toon, if a man meets a man knock 'im doon, but doan't 'ot 'im," which translates as: "house against house, town against town, if a man meets a man, knock him down but don't hurt him."

The Towns mentioned are the villages of Westwoodside and Haxey, and Houses are the public houses (pubs) of those villages.
The pubs are:
The Carpenters Arms – Newbigg, Westwoodside
Duke William Hotel since 1730 – Church Street, Haxey
The Loco – 31 Church Street, Haxey
The Kings Arms – Low Street, Haxey

After the speech, the Fool leads the crowd to the middle of a field where the game is to be played.

Venue

Haxey is a large parish on the southern border of the Isle of Axholme. It consists of the villages of Haxey and Westwoodside with the hamlets of High Burnham, Low Burnham, East Lound and Graizelound. In earlier days, Westwoodside was divided into Park, Newbigg, Nethergate, Upperthorpe (or Overthorpe) and Commonside.

Playing the game

The thirteen characters from the original story are represented as follows: there is the Lord, the Fool and eleven Boggins, one of the Boggins being the chief Boggin.

The Lord and chief Boggin are dressed in hunting pink (red) coats and top hats decorated with flowers and badges. The Lord also carries his wand of office. This is a staff made from twelve willow wands with one more upside down in the centre. These are bound thirteen times with willow twigs and a red ribbon at the top. The thirteen willow wands are supposed to represent the twelve apostles and the upside down one represents Judas. The staff is supposed to represent the sword and the blood from when the game was played with a bullock's head after it had been slaughtered. The Fool has multi-coloured strips of material attached to his trousers and top. He wears a feathered hat decorated with flowers and rags, and his face is smeared with soot and red ochre. He carries a whip and sock filled with bran, with which he belabours anyone who comes within reach. The remaining ten Boggins wear red jumpers. The game is played by locals, although anyone can join in. There are no official teams, but everyone involved tries to push the Hood towards their favoured pub. 
 
Proceedings start at around 3pm with the throwing of twelve Sack Hoods. These are rolled hessian sacks sewn up to prevent them unrolling. This is a prequel to the main game, mainly for children. The youngsters in the crowd run for them when thrown and attempt to get them off the field. If they are tackled then they must immediately throw it in the air unless the challenger is a Boggin in which case the hood is ‘boggined’ and it is returned to the Lord who starts it off again.

The first two or three of these are stopped by the Boggins on the edge of the field and the hoods returned to the Lord. After a while the Boggins let the Sack Hoods be taken off the field in which case they can be returned later for a cash reward, currently two pounds.

After this bit of fun to warm up the crowd the Sway Hood is then thrown up in the air. The rugby type scrum (or Sway to give it its official title) then converges on the Hood and the game starts in earnest. The idea is to get the Sway Hood into one of the four pubs in either Haxey or Westwoodside.

The Hood, which cannot be thrown or run with, is moved slowly by 'swaying', that is pushing and pulling the Hood and people within the 'Sway' toward the direction of their pub. Although everyone is trying to push in a particular direction, there are no real organised teams. The Sway makes very slow progress, as it snakes around, stopping quite often when it collapses, in order to pull bodies out, that became crushed into the mud. Safety is of prime concern and the whole thing is supervised by the Boggins. The Lord is referee and sees that the game is played fairly. At any one time there are usually around 200 people in the Sway and about one thousand people watching. Games can last anything from a couple of hours onwards and have been known to go on well into the night. Everything in the path of the Sway goes down before it, including hedges and walls. Another of the Boggins' jobs is to stop the Sway destroying everything in its path.

Nobody parks on the roads where the Sway may go, and for good reason. In 2002, a couple of drivers parked opposite the Duke William. The Sway headed right for them and pushed one of the cars 10 feet down the road and into the other.

The game ends when the Hood arrives at one of the pubs and is touched by the landlord from his front step. The landlord then takes charge of the Hood for the year, and is supposed to give everyone a free drink. The winning pub pours beer over the Hood and then hangs it behind the bar (each pub has two hooks especially for this purpose). According to legend, it used to be roasted on a spit over the pub fire having been doused with ale, which was then drunk by those present.

The Hood hangs in the winning pub until New Year's Eve when it is collected by the Boggins in time for the next game.

Winners since 2000

See also
English folklore

References

 Hole, Christina (1978). A Dictionary of British Folk Customs, pp139–143, Paladin Granada,

External links
Article Source
Peacock, M. "The Hood-Game at Haxey, Lincolnshire" Folk-Lore. Volume 7, 1896. 3:330–49
 Haxey Parish Council
 A Haxey Hood info site

Traditional football
Sport in Lincolnshire
Lincolnshire folklore
January events